Lukáš Lacko was the defending champion, but lost in the final to Denis Istomin.

Seeds

Draw

Finals

Top half

Bottom half

References
 Main Draw
 Qualifying Draw

2015 ATP Challenger Tour
2015 - Singles